Emperor Ling may refer to:

Emperor Ling of Han (156–189)
Lü Zuan (died 401), emperor of Later Liang